Cassidy & Associates is a government-relations firm based in Washington, D.C. In 2018, the company received $14,170,000 in income from various companies for lobbying of the United States government. According to The Washington Post its founder, Gerald Cassidy, was once worth $125 million, possibly the richest Washington lobbyist. In 1999 and 2000, Cassidy & Associates led all lobbying firms in reported income.

History 
Beginning in 2004, the firm represented Equatorial Guinean president Teodoro Obiang, "one of Africa's most notorious dictators". According to the United States Department of Justice the president paid Cassidy & Associates at least $120,000 per month. Mother Jones has described the agency as almost "a shadow foreign ministry" for the country.

In 2007, The Washington Post reported, "Cassidy helped invent the new Washington," and was "creator and proprietor of the most lucrative lobbying firm in Washington."

Kai Anderson, former Deputy Chief of Staff to Senate Majority Leader Harry Reid, serves as the firm's CEO, and Barry Rhoads, former Deputy General Counsel to the 1991 Department of Defense Base Realignment and Closure Commission (BRAC), serves as its chairman.

In 2015, the firm's founder and namesake, Gerald S. J. Cassidy, stepped down after 38 years of leading the firm.

The firm reported earning $12.85 million in 2015, according to records filed under the Lobbying Disclosure Act (LDA) with the Secretary of the U.S. Senate and Clerk of the U.S. House of Representatives.

In 2017, the Associated Press reported that the firm had been hired by the Egyptian intelligence services. In late February, the U.S. State Department cataloged human rights abuses in Egypt in its annual report. The Egyptian government hired Cassidy & Associates and its parent company Weber Shandwick to improve Egypt's image in the United States.

In June 2017, Cassidy announced a management buyout from The Interpublic Group (IPG), returning it to an independent firm.

References

External links
Cassidy & Associates Web site

Lobbying firms
Companies based in Washington, D.C.